Valeriu Soare (born 25 June 1932) is a Romanian former footballer, playing mainly as central forward. He had played for Progresul București.

International career
Valeriu Soare played five games at international level for Romania, making his debut on 28 June 1956 under coach Gheorghe Popescu I in a friendly which ended with a 2–0 victory against Norway. He also played three games at the 1960 European Nations' Cup qualifiers as Romania reached the quarter-finals where they were defeated by Czechoslovakia, who advanced to the final tournament. He also appeared twice for Romania's Olympic team at the 1960 Summer Olympics qualifiers.

Honours
Progresul București
Cupa României: 1959–60

Notes

References

1932 births
Romanian footballers
Romania international footballers
Olympic footballers of Romania
Association football forwards
Liga I players
FC Progresul București players
Living people